Adv. A. A. Rahim is a member of Rajyasabha from Kerala since 2022. He is currently officiating as the all India president of Democratic Youth Federation of India. Rahim is also a member of the Kerala State Committee of Communist Party of India (Marxist).

He became the second-youngest CPI(M) member to become a Rajya Sabha member, only after M. A. Baby – a Politburo member of CPI(M), in 2022. Rahim is a recognisable figure in Kerala's political sphere after becoming an active participant in the prime-time political debates in Malayalam channels.

A. A. Rahim has also served as the Central Executive Committee member of Students Federation of India and the syndicate member of University of Kerala.

Personal life
A. A. Rahim was born in Thyacaud in Manikkal Grama Panchayath near Venjaramoodu in Thiruvananthapuram district. His parents are M. Abdul Samad, who is a war veteran, and A. Nabeesa Beevi. He was married to Amrita Satheesan and has two children, Gulmohar and Gulnar.

Education
A. A. Rahim completed his primary education at Pirappankode Government LP School. He has completed SSLC from Pirappankode Govt. higher-secondary school. Later he did his Pre-degree from NSS College, Nilamel in Kollam. Rahim completed his Bachelors and Post Graduate Degree in Islamic History from University College, Thiruvananthapuram. Later, he graduated in Law from Thiruvananthapuram Kerala Law Academy Law College  and enrolled as a lawyer in Bar Council of Kerala. He is continuing his research in Islamic History at the University of Kerala on the topic ‘Print Media and the Muslim Renaissance Movements in Kerala’. Rahim also holds a Diploma in Journalism from Bharatiya Vidya Bhavan, Thiruvananthapuram. He has briefly worked as a journalist at Kairali TV.

Political Work
A. A. Rahim has been the Chairman of the Kerala University Union and a member of the Kerala University Syndicate. In the 2011 Assembly elections, he contested as the Left Democratic Front candidate from Varkala Assembly constituency. He was the editor of Yuvadhara magazine. He has served as the Kerala state Vice President of Students Federation of India, Kerala State Secretary of Democratic Youth Federation of India,

In 2020, under the leadership of A. A. Rahim, DYFI organised a novel campaign called 'Recycle Kerala' to collect recyclable waste material from homes and public places. As a part of the 'Recycle Kerala' campaign, DYFI workers across Kerala collected about 6.5 tonnes of plastic waste from the state's water bodies. DYFI collected about Rs. 10.95 Crore which was donated to Rebuild Kerala initiative of the then LDF Government.

Currently, he is officiating as the national President of Democratic Youth Federation of India.

He is also a member of the Kerala state committee of Communist Party of India (Marxist).

References

Rajya Sabha members from Kerala
Communist Party of India (Marxist) politicians
Year of birth missing (living people)
Living people
Communist Party of India (Marxist) politicians from Kerala